Sutturu (Also spelled Suttur/Suthur/Suththur) is a village on the banks of the river Kapila, in the state of Karnataka, India. It is located in the Nanjangud taluk in the district of Mysore. It is famous for the Suttur Mutt which is one of the most prominent spiritual centres of India.

Suttur is a village situated on the banks of the River Kapila in Nanjangud taluk, Mysuru district. It is located at a distance of 28 km south of Mysuru (connected by State Highway via Varuna village) and around 170 km from Bengaluru. The shrine of Adi Jagadguru Sri Shivrathreeshwara Shivayogi Mahaswamiji is the main temple at Suttur. Thousands of devotees visit the shrine throughout the year.

History
Community life in India is closely linked with spiritual and religious institutions for the past five thousand years. The sages have been the beacons and guiding forces in upholding the moral values of life and in the progression of society as a whole. The glorious Jagadguru Sri Veerasimhasana Mahasamsthana Math, popularly known as Sri Suttur Math is a reflection of rich tradition and culture.
Jagadguru Sri Veerasimhasana Mahasamsthana Math with a long history of more than one thousand years is a multi-dimensional institution that has contributed immensely to the cause of societal advancement. The welfare activities of the Math transcend the public of all the sections of Indian society. The inscriptional pieces of evidence support the establishment of Suttur Math during the reign of the Chola kingdom. The name Shivarathri is mentioned in many ancient works. The founding of the Math can be traced to a historical event linked with Sri Shivarathreeshwara Shivayogi Mahaswamiji crusading for peace between two warring kingdoms. The hostility between King Rachamalla IV of the Gangas of Talakadu and King Rajaraja of the Chola dynasty was about to break up into a large scale war. It was due to the timely intervention of Sri Shivarathreeshwara Mahaswamiji, the hostility ended and the enemies became friends. Then, at the request of King Rajaraja Chola, Mahaswamiji graciously consented to establish a Math on the banks of the River Kapila at Suttur near Mysuru.
Jagadguru Sri Eshaneshwara Wodeyar Mahaswamiji, the second pontiff, was responsible for the further development of the Suttur Math during the times of King Rajendra Chola. The Someshwara temple near the Math at Suttur is said to have been constructed by the Chola kings, in accordance with the wishes of Jagadguru Sri Eshaneshwara Wodeyar Mahaswamiji. An inscription referring to this event was dated October 23, 1032.

Culture

Sri Suttur Math 
Jagadguru Sri Veerasimhasana Mahasamsthana Math, popularly known as Sri Suttur Math has a history of 1,000 years. Adijagadguru Sri Shivarathreeshwara Shivayogi Mahaswamiji established Sri Math around the 11th century AD. Suttur Math grew over centuries with the immense contributions of the glorious lineage. It has become a multidimensional organisation that has contributed to all-around societal development. Sri Suttur Math set foot into the field of education with the establishment of Jagadguru Sri Shivarathreeshwara Mahavidyapeetha (JSS Mahavidyapeetha) by the 23rd pontiff of Sri Suttur Math Jagadguru Sri Shivarathri Rajendra Mahaswamiji. He believed that education is the only key to societal development. JSS began the voyage with the establishment of a High School in Mysuru in 1954. Now, JSS Mahavidyapeetha runs more than 300 educational institutions in Karnataka, parts of India and abroad. The present and the 24th Pontiff Jagadguru Sri Shivarathri Deshikendra Mahaswamiji is the President of JSS Mahavidyapeetha.
Jagadguru Sri Veerasimhasana Mahasamsthana Math can most aptly be described as an active ongoing movement to uphold the cause of social and economic justice, based on spiritual values and ideals. The Math's activities at Suttur have spread far and wide beyond the small region on the banks of the River Kapila in Karnataka to touch the lives of millions going beyond the boundaries of our country, and even to the distant shores of the other countries.
A quick look at the lineage of the Math brings to light the unwavering societal concern of the Pontiffs. If the founding of the Math was incidental to establishing harmony and peace between the two warring factions of the region by its founder, Adijagadguru Sri Shivarathreeshwara Mahaswamiji, the Pontiffs who followed saw purpose in promoting academics, literature, healthcare, infrastructure, etc.
The two guiding principles that Math stands on are "Work is worship" and "Selfless Services". Sri Math continues to serve the people irrespective of religion,caste, creed, gender or colour. 
The lineage of Sri Suttur Math
The Suttur Math region grew up over the centuries with the contribution of each one of its illustrious pontiffs. Each pontiff chose his route to further the advancement of society. The high stature that the Sri Suttur Math enjoys today is thus the cumulative result of their initiatives, efforts and actions.
1. Jagadguru Sri Shivarathreeshwara Shivayogi Mahaswamiji
2. Jagadguru Sri Eeshaneshwara Wodeyar Mahaswamiji
3.Jagadguru Sri Nijalinga Shivacharya Mahaswamiji
4.Jagadguru Sri Siddananja Deshikendra Mahaswamiji
5.Jagadguru Sri Kapininanjunda Deshikendra Mahaswamiji
6. Jagadguru Sri Channaveera Deshikendra Mahaswamiji
7. Jagadguru Sri Siddhamalla Shivacharya Mahaswamiji
8. Jagadguru Sri Parvathendra Shivacharya Mahaswamiji
9.Jagadguru Sri Bhandari Basappa Wodeyar Mahaswamiji
10.Jagadguru Sri Koogaluru Nanjunda Deshikendra Mahaswamiji
11.Jagadguru Sri Ghanalingadeva Mahaswamiji
12. Jagadguru Sri Immadi Shivarathreeshwara Mahaswamiji
13. Jagadguru Sri Channabasava Deshikendra Mahaswamiji
14. Jagadguru Sri Gurunanja Deshikendra Mahaswamiji
15. Jagadguru Sri Guruchannabasa Shivacharya Mahaswamiji
16. Jagadguru Sri Gurupanchakshara Deshikendra Mahaswamiji
17. Jagadguru Sri Chidghana Shivacharya Mahaswamiji
18. Jagadguru Sri Channaveera Deshikendra Mahaswamiji
19.Jagadguru Sri Mahanta Deshikendra Mahaswamiji
20. Jagadguru Sri Siddhamalla Shivacharya Mahaswamiji
21. Jagadguru Sri Shivarathri Dehshikendra Mahaswamiji
22. Jagadguru Sri Mantramaharshi Pattada Sri Shivarathreeshwara Mahaswamiji
23. Jagadguru Dr Sri Shivarathri Rajendra Mahaswamiji
24. Jagadguru Sri Shivarathri Deshikendra Mahaswamiji  - Present Pontiff

Education

Sri Suttur Math has created a revolution in the field of education with the establishment of JSS Mahavidyapeetha. For over 6 decades the institution has been catering to the various educational needs of common people. Jagadguru Sri Shivaratri Rajendra Mahaswamiji was a visionary and he knew that lack of knowledge is one of the main hindrances to the development of society. Under the patronage of JSS Mahavidyapeetha, Rajendra Swamiji started Jnana Dasoha by establishing schools, Anna Dasoha by providing food and accommodation to the needy children and Arogya Dasoha by setting up healthcare centres. Today, the JSS Mahavidyapeetha has more than 300 institutions in India and abroad. JSS has educational institutions at Suttur. The following are the major educational institutions at Suttur. 

 J.S.S.Higher Primary School was established in 1991. The school has 2,150 books in the library and 50 computers. There are grades from first to eighth. 50 teachers are working here.

 Government L.P.School was established in 1997. They run grades first to fifth. There are three classrooms and three teachers. The library has 190 volumes.

 JSS School established in 2002 by Shivaratri Deshikendra Mahaswamiji provides free education and residential facilities to children from the economically weak backgrounds.

Transport

Road 
Sutturu is connected to Mysuru with Karnataka State Highway 84A. Karnataka State Highway 84 connects Sutturu to the Taluk headquarters Nanjangud.

Bus 
Sutturu is connected to all major cities nearby via the state public bus system KSRTC as well as private bus networks. A typical trip to Mysuru takes about an hour.

Rail 
The closest prominent railway station is at Nanjangud, with a few trains connecting it to Mysuru, Bengaluru and Tirupati. Mysuru railway station is bigger and has railway connections all over the country.

Air 
The closest airport, Mysore Airport, is about 25 km away, with domestic flights to Chennai. Nearest international airports are at Coimbatore (170 km) and Bangalore (200 km).

Post office
The village has a post office and the postal code is 571129.

See also
 Jeemaralli
 Nagarle
Alambur
 Kahalli
Bilugali

References

Villages in Mysore district
Lingayatism